Moskovskiye Vorota (Moscow Gate) is a station of the Saint Petersburg Metro. The station was opened on April 29, 1961.

Significant cultural objects
Moscow Triumphal Gate is located near the station.

External links

Saint Petersburg Metro stations
Railway stations in Russia opened in 1961
1961 establishments in the Soviet Union
Railway stations located underground in Russia